Ear stapling is a form of acupuncture that involves inserting a thin staple through a portion of the pinna—the visible part of the ear.  Ear stapling has been suggested as an alternative weight-loss treatment, and there is some claimed evidence to support its efficacy but none from reputable scientific journals.

References

Ear piercing